The 2019 WPA World Nine-ball Championship was a nine-ball pool championship, which took place from December 13 to 17, 2019 at the al-Arabi Sports Club in Doha, Qatar. The defending champion was Germany's Joshua Filler, who won the 2018 event defeating Carlo Biado in the final 13–10.

Russian Fedor Gorst won the event, defeating Taipei's Chang Jung-lin in the final 13–11.

Results

Finals
The following is results from the last-16 stage onwards.

Grand Final

References

External links

2019
WPA World Nine-ball Championship
WPA World Nine-ball Championship
International sports competitions hosted by Qatar
WPA World Nine-ball Championship
Sports competitions in Doha